The Woman Who Still Wants to Marry (also known as Still, Marry Me) is a 2010 South Korean romantic comedy television series that revolves around three thirtysomething career women in their quest for true love. It stars Park Jin-hee, Uhm Ji-won, Wang Bit-na and Kim Bum. It aired on MBC from January 20 to March 11, 2010 on Wednesdays and Thursdays at 21:55 for 16 episodes.

Plot
Broadcast journalist Shin-young (Park Jin-hee) is 34, and wants to find love, but it's hard to stay positive when she's faced with high workplace pressure and a string of failed relationships. Just when it seems like her chances may have passed, she meets a musician ten years her junior (Kim Bum), and her former fiancé (Lee Pil-mo) comes back to rekindle the flame. Korean-English translator Da-jung (Uhm Ji-won) desperately wants to get married within a year. She won't settle for anything less than the perfect man, but will that really result in the perfect marriage? Restaurant consultant Bu-ki (Wang Bit-na) is done with the marriage game. She broke off her engagement, studied overseas, and is satisfied on her own terms as an efficient, sophisticated woman.

Cast

Main characters
 Park Jin-hee as Lee Shin-young
 Kim Bum as Ha Min-jae
 Uhm Ji-won as Jung Da-jung
 Wang Bit-na as Kim Bu-ki
 Choi Cheol-ho as Na Ban-suk
 Lee Pil-mo as Yoon Sang-woo
Park Ji-young as Choi Sang-mi

Supporting characters
 Kim Yong-hee as Choi Myung-suk
Ahn Hye-kyung as Jang Hye-jin
 Park Hyo-jun as Hee-dong
Jeon Se-hong as Jeon Se-ri
Jung Won-joong as Director Buk
 Chun Woo-hee as Shin-young's junior colleague
 Baek Il-seob as Ban-suk's father
 Jung Soo-young as Sang-woo's colleague
 Jo Han-sun as Shin-young's ex-fiancé (cameo)
Min Ah-ryung as ex-fiancé's girlfriend
 Im Chang-jung as Jerry Oh (cameo)
 Danny Ahn as Bu-ki's ex-boyfriend (cameo)
 Park Chul-min as psychic (cameo)
Kim Sung-hoon as gangster
 Na Young-hee as Shin-young's fan
Kim Min-shik as Director Kim Min-shik (cameo, ep 12)
Gook Ji-yun as Oh Se-na (cameo, ep 15)

Episode ratings

Source: TNS Media Korea

International broadcast
 The series aired in Japan on Fuji TV beginning February 18, 2011. It was rebroadcast on Japanese cable channels KNTV from June 16 to October 2, 2010, and LaLaTV beginning April 7, 2014.
 In Thailand the series aired on Channel 5 under the title Still, Marry Me beginning September 19, 2011.
 In Vietnam the series aired on VTC9 under the title "Những cặp đôi tuổi dần", beginning from November 6, 2011.

References

External links
The Woman Who Still Wants to Marry official MBC website 

Still, Marry Me at MBC Global Media

Korean-language television shows
2010 South Korean television series debuts
2010 South Korean television series endings
South Korean romantic comedy television series
MBC TV television dramas
Sequel television series
Television series by Kim Jong-hak Production